Pirmal Singh Dhaula (born 8 September 1980) is an Indian politician and a member of Aam Aadmi Party. In the 2017 Punjab Legislative Assembly election, he was elected as the member of the Punjab Legislative Assembly from Bhadaur Assembly constituency. He resigned from his seat in June 2021 and joined Indian National Congress.

Constituency
Singh Dhaula represents the Bhadaur Assembly constituency. He won the seat as a candidate of the Aam Aadmi Party, beating the incumbent member of the Punjab Legislative Assembly Sant Balvir Singh Ghunas of the Shiromani Akali Dal by 20,784 votes.

References

Living people
Punjab, India MLAs 2017–2022
1980 births
Politicians from Barnala district
Aam Aadmi Party politicians from Punjab, India
Indian National Congress politicians from Punjab, India